Igor Levit (born 10 March 1987) is a Russian-German pianist who focuses on the works of Bach, Beethoven, and Liszt. He is also a professor at the Musikhochschule Hannover. He lives in Berlin.

Biography 
Born in Gorky (now Nizhny Novgorod) to a Jewish family, Levit began playing piano at the age of three. He received piano lessons from his mother Elena Levit, a piano teacher, répétiteur and grand-disciple of Heinrich Neuhaus. As a child, he had his first successes on the concert stage in his hometown. His family moved to Hannover in 1995.

Levit has appeared in major concert halls and music festivals around the world. During his studies, he won prizes in several international competitions including second prize at the International Maria Callas Grand Prix in Athens (2004), first prize at the 9th Hamamatsu International Piano Academy Competition in Hamamatsu (2004), the second prize at the piano competition Kissinger Klavierolymp (2004), the silver medal and three other awards at the Arthur Rubinstein International Piano Master Competition in Tel Aviv (2005). In October 2011, he appeared in a 45-minute documentary aired on 3sat about his love for the music of Franz Liszt. He was a BBC Radio 3 New Generation Artist from 2011 to 2013.

Levit was appointed to a professorship at the Hochschule für Musik, Theater und Medien Hannover (Hannover University of Music, Drama and Media) starting in the winter semester 2019/2020. In 2021, Levit contributed a cover of the Metallica song "Nothing Else Matters" to the charity tribute album The Metallica Blacklist.

Awards 
 2009 Luitpold Prize for young artists at the Festival Kissinger Sommer in Bad Kissingen
 2017 Beethoven Ring
 2018 Gilmore Artist Award
 1 October 2020 Order of Merit of the Federal Republic of Germany

Hauskonzerte 
During the Coronavirus pandemic of 2020, Levit began streaming concerts from his home in Berlin Mitte. He posted these to Twitter as a series of Hauskonzerte:

 12 March 2020: Beethoven's Piano Sonata No. 21 in C major, Op. 53 ('Waldstein')
 13 March 2020: Frederic Rzewski's The People United Will Never Be Defeated!
 14 March 2020: Bach's Chaconne in a transcription for left hand by Brahms
 15 March 2020: Beethoven's Piano Sonata No. 23 in F minor, Op. 57 ('Appassionata')
 17 March 2020: Beethoven's Piano Sonata No. 14 in C-sharp minor "Quasi una fantasia" ('Moonlight')
 18 March 2020: Schubert's "Six moments musicaux"
 19 March 2020: Schubert's Piano Sonata in B-flat major, D. 960
 20 March 2020: Schubert's Piano Sonata in A major, D. 959
 21 March 2020: Schumann's Fantasie in C major, Op. 17
 22 March 2020: Shostakovich's Piano Sonata No. 2 in B minor, Op. 61
 23 March 2020: Beethoven's Piano Sonata No. 31 in A-flat major, Op. 110
 24 March 2020: Arrangements of Bach's Nun komm' der heiden Heiland, BWV 659, and Ich ruf zu dir, Herr Jesu Christ, BWV 639; and Busoni's Berceuse, BV 252, and Fantasia nach Johann Sebastian Bach, BV 253
 25 March 2020: Beethoven's Piano Sonata No. 17 in D minor, Op. 31/2 ('Tempest')
 28 March 2020: Mozart's Piano Sonata No. 17 in B-flat major, K. 570
 29 March 2020: Transcriptions of Mahler's Adagietto, Billy Joel's "And So It Goes", Frederic Rzewski's "A Mensch", and Frederic Weatherly's "Danny Boy"
 30 March 2020: Beethoven's Piano Sonata No. 18 in E-flat major, Op. 31/3
 31 March 2020: Liszt's Sonetto 123 del Petrarca in A-flat major; Brahms' Intermezzo in A major Op. 118/2; and Liszt's transcription of Wagner's "Isoldens Liebestod"
 1 April 2020: Schubert's Impromptu No. 3 in G-flat major and Allegretto in C minor, D. 915; Brahms' Ballade in B major, Op. 10/4
 2 April 2020: Beethoven's Piano Sonata No. 21 in C major, Op. 53 ('Waldstein'), streamed from the Schloss Bellevue concert room
 3 April 2020: Two of Mendelssohn's "Songs Without Words"; Jobim's "Luiza"; Schumann's ""; and Janis Ian's "Stars"
 4 April 2020: Solovyov-Sedoi & Matusovsky's "Moscow Nights"; Gershwin's "Rhapsody in Blue"
 5 April 2020: Tchaikovsky's "The Seasons" (except "September")
 6 April 2020: Tchaikovsky's "September" (from "The Seasons"); Beethoven's Piano Sonata No. 8 in C minor, Op. 13 ('Pathétique')
 7 April 2020: Satie's Gnossienne No. 3 and Gymnopédie No. 1; Fred Hersch's "Valentine"; and Beethoven's "Rondo alla ingharese quasi un capriccio" in G major, Op. 129 ('Rage Over a Lost Penny')
 8 April 2020: Shostakovich's 24 Preludes Op. 34
 9 April 2020: Three of Scott Joplin's Rags; Bolcom's "Graceful Ghost Rag"; Schubert's "Hungarian Melody"; and Curran's "For Cornelius"
 10 April 2020: Dessau's "Guernica"; Rzewski's "Which Side Are You On?"; and Cardew's Thälmann Variations
 11 April 2020: Liszt's "Il penseroso" in C-sharp minor and Dante Sonata in D minor
 12 April 2020: Beethoven's Piano Sonata No. 32 in C minor, Op. 111
 13 April 2020: Beethoven's Diabelli Variations, Op. 120
 14 April 2020: Beethoven's 6 Variations in F major, Op. 34; and Piano Sonata No. 6 in F major, Op. 10/2
 15 April 2020: Beethoven's Piano Sonata No. 26 in E-flat major, Op. 81a ('les Adieux')
 17 April 2020: Mussorgsky's "Pictures at an Exhibition"
 18 April 2020: Schumann's Arabeske in C major, Op. 18; transcription of Mahler's Adagio from Symphony No. 10
 19 April 2020: Bach's "Contrapunctus I" from The Art of Fugue; Busoni's Fantasia contrappuntistica
 20 April 2020: Stevenson's Passacaglia on DSCH
 21 April 2020: Alkan's Prelude No. 8 in A-flat minor, Op. 31 ('The Song of the Madwoman on the Seashore'); Hindemith's "Suite 1922"
 22 April 2020: Beethoven's Piano Sonata No. 23 in F minor, Op. 57 ('Appassionata')
 23 April 2020: Liszt's "Feierlicher Marsch zum heiligen Gral aus Parsifal", S. 450; Prokofiev's Piano Sonata No. 7 in B-flat major, Op. 83
 24 April 2020: Liszt's "O du mein holder Abendstern", S. 444; Prokofiev's Piano Sonata No. 4 in C minor, Op. 29
 25 April 2020: Liszt's paraphrase of "Valhalla" (from Wagner's Das Rheingold); Prokofiev's Piano Sonata No. 9 in C major, Op. 103
 26 April 2020: Schumann's Theme and Variations in E-flat major for piano ('Geistervariationen'); Feldman's "Palais de Mari"
 27 April 2020: Reger's "Variations and Fugue on a Theme by J.S. Bach", Op. 81
 28 April 2020: Beethoven's Piano Sonata No. 2 in A major, Op. 2/2
 29 April 2020: Three of Mendelssohn's Songs Without Words; Debussy's Six épigraphes antiques; Second movement of Schubert's Piano Sonata in A major, D. 664
 30 April 2020: Beethoven's Ländler; Beethoven's Piano Sonata No. 30 in E major, Op. 109; Chopin's Scherzo No. 3 in C-sharp minor, Op. 39
 2 May 2020: Bach's Goldberg Variations, BWV 988
 3 May 2020: Six of Brahms' Choral Preludes, Op. 122 (transcribed by Busoni)
 4 May 2020: Beethoven's Piano Sonata No. 16 in G Major, Op. 31/1; Beethoven's Piano Sonata No. 27 in E minor, Op. 90
 24 May 2020: Ten of Bach's Chorale Preludes (transcribed by Busoni (BV B 27))

Separately from these concerts, on 30/31 May 2020 Levit gave a solo performance of Vexations by Erik Satie, from a studio in Berlin, over a period of over 15 hours.

Discography 
In 2007, when he was 20 years old, Levit released his debut album, a set of Beethoven's piano concertos, with the Cologne Chamber Orchestra, conducted by Helmut Müller-Brühl on Naxos records. In 2013, he released a two-disc set of Ludwig van Beethoven's late piano sonatas (Nos. 28 to 32), on Sony Classical Records. His second Sony album, a recording of Johann Sebastian Bach's six keyboard partitas, was named Gramophone Magazine's recording of the month for October 2014. His third Sony album, a 3-CD set of Bach's Goldberg Variations, Beethoven's Diabelli Variations, and The People United Will Never Be Defeated! by Frederic Rzewski, was released in October 2015. His fourth album was a 2-CD set released in 2018 entitled Life, including works by Busoni, Bach, Schumann, Rzewski, Wagner, Liszt, and Bill Evans. It was Levit's response to the death of his best friend, German artist , who died in a bicycle accident in 2016.

His recordings of the complete Beethoven piano sonatas were released by Sony Classical on 13 September 2019. Levit was named Gramophone's 2020 Artist of the Year. His recording On DSCH, pairing Shostakovich's 24 Preludes and Fugues Op.87 with Ronald Stevenson's epic Passacaglia on DSCH, was issued by Sony in 2021.

Albums

Writings

Film

References

Further reading

External links
 
 
 
 

1987 births
Living people
Russian classical pianists
Male classical pianists
German classical pianists
Jewish classical pianists
German people of Russian-Jewish descent
20th-century Russian Jews
21st-century classical pianists
Musicians from Nizhny Novgorod
Hochschule für Musik, Theater und Medien Hannover alumni
Russian expatriates in Germany
Mozarteum University Salzburg alumni
BBC Radio 3 New Generation Artists
21st-century Russian male musicians
Recipients of the Cross of the Order of Merit of the Federal Republic of Germany
Musicians from Hanover